John F. Sirianni (born July 17, 1975) is an American baseball coach and former pitcher. He is the head baseball coach at Sam Houston State University. Sirianni played college baseball at Texas A&M University in 1995 and at the University of Nebraska–Lincoln from 1996 to 1999 for coach Dave Van Horn and in Minor League Baseball (MiLB) for two seasons from 1999 to 2000.

Sirianni was born in Des Moines, Iowa. He attended Indianola High School in Indianola, Iowa. After graduation from high school, he decided to attend Texas A&M University to play baseball. After his freshman year, he transferred to play college baseball at the University of Nebraska–Lincoln. After his senior season, he was signed as a free agent with the Cleveland Indians.

In 2019, Sirianni was named the head coach of the Sam Houston State Bearkats baseball program, succeeding Matt Deggs.

Playing career
Sirianni attended Indianola High School where he was a member of the school's football and baseball teams. After graduation, Sirianni choose to attend Texas A&M University. After a single season at Texas A&M, Sirianni transferred to Nebraska. Sirianni pitched 4 seasons for the Cornhuskers. Leading the team in innings pitched and wins in 1998.

Coaching career
From 2002 to August, 2004, Sirianni was the pitching coach at Barton County Community College.

On August 2, 2004, Sirianni was named the pitching coach at UT Arlington.

On July 25, 2019, Sirianni was promoted to the head coach of the Bearkats.

See also
 List of current NCAA Division I baseball coaches

References

External links

Sam Houston State Bearkats profile

1975 births
Living people
Baseball pitchers
Texas A&M Aggies baseball players
Nebraska Cornhuskers baseball players
Mahoning Valley Scrappers players
Burlington Indians players (1986–2006)
Kinston Indians players
Columbus Red Stixx players
Barton Cougars baseball coaches
UT Arlington Mavericks baseball coaches
Sam Houston Bearkats baseball coaches
People from Des Moines, Iowa
Baseball coaches from Iowa